Qasr al-Banat, Girls castle or Palace of the Ladies, are a set of brick ruins of a residence dating from the 12th century in the Syrian city of Raqqa.

Location

When in the 1970s the modern city began to expand rapidly, the entire historic area was overbuilt.

History

The Roman-Byzantine city of Callinicum was conquered by the Arabs in 639 CE and renamed Raqqa ("the flood plain"). The Umayyad caliph Hisham ibn Abd al-Malik (r. 723–743) is said by medieval sources to have built two palaces nearby. The Abbasid Caliph al-Mansur (r. 754–775), later called the city ar-Rafiqa ("the partner") and used it as a fortress against the Byzantines, building and attaching horseshoe-shaped walls on the straight side of the south wall that runs parallel to the former river bed of the Euphrates. Ar-Rafiqa became the residence of Harun al-Rashid (r. 786–809). He set up a palace outside the city walls in the northeast. After this period, a renovation was carried out in 1165/66 under Nur ad-Din Mahmud. The ruins present today have been dated to around 1168, from Nur al-Din's time.

By 1900, the ruins of Raqqa were repeatedly examined and documented by the likes of Ernst Herzfeld, who along with Friedrich Sarre conducted an archaeological survey of Mesopotamia between the Euphrates and the Tigris in 1907. They explored Raqqa in detail and a little later, in 1909, Gertrude Bell also visited the site, then largely an uninhabited ruin.

Style
The building is composed of various vaulted halls that lead to a central courtyard in Ayyubid ornamental form. The building's construction is of Iranian origin and was very rare in 12th century Syria.

The northern main hall fills the entire width of the courtyard divided into a three aisles. Surrounding it are a total of 41 irregular rooms that are not symmetrical. From 1977 to 1982 Kassem Toueir excavated and rebuilt the site for the Syrian Department of Antiquities. The walls and arches now visible are mainly reconstructed from newly fired bricks. One original diagonal wall segment remains, with a three-story stucco, where the various remains of the past are superimposed on the modern, with some ancient muqarnas and stepped arched niches still recognisable. When Friedrich Sarre and Ernst Herzfeld visited the site in 1907, followed by Gertrude Bell in 1910, they found this part of the building as a single upright on an otherwise flat ruin.

The area is fenced and is normally closed, but visible from all sides.

References

Robert Hillenbrand: Eastern Islamic influences in Syria: Raqqa and Qal'at Ja'bar in the later 12th century in:. Julian Raby (ed.): The Art of Syria and the Jazira, 1100-1250 Oxford University Press, Oxford, pp. 37, 1985.

External links
Pat McDonnell Twair. Raqqa A Career at Saudi Aramco World, September / October 1995

Islamic architecture
Archaeological sites in Raqqa Governorate
Tourist attractions in Syria
Buildings and structures in Raqqa
History of Raqqa Governorate